Een dubbeltje te weinig ("A dubbeltje too little") is a 1991 Dutch film directed by André van Duren.

Cast
Boris Rodenko	... 	Jop
Dokus Dagelet	... 	Ankie
Henriëtte Tol	... 	To Ruif
Hans Hoes	... 	Jaap Omvlee
Kees Hulst	... 	Jan Ruif
Johan Ooms	... 	Johannes Pieterman
Wim Kouwenhoven	... 	Joris Donker
Han Römer	... 	Ambtenaar sociale zaken
Hammy de Beukelaer	... 	Kastelein
Lettie Oosthoek	... 	Moeder van To
Jan Wegter	... 	Vader van To
Ottolien Boeschoten	... 	Vriendin van To
Con Meyer	... 	Fietsenmaker
Marijon Luitjes	... 	Verjaardagsgaste
Gwen Eckhaus	... 	Verjaardagsgaste

External links 
 

Dutch drama films
1991 films
1990s Dutch-language films
Films directed by André van Duren